John, Johnnie or Johnny Allan may refer to:

Politics 
John Allan (Canadian politician) (1856–1922), Canadian politician, member for Hamilton West, 1914–1919
John Allan (Australian politician) (1866–1936), Premier of Victoria, 1924–1927
John Beresford Allan (1841–1927), politician in Manitoba, Canada
John Allan (Victorian MLC), colonial Victorian politician

Sports 
John Allan (Australian footballer) (1882–1933), Australian rules footballer for Collingwood
John Allan (footballer, born 1872) (1872–?), footballer for Derby County and Notts County
John Allan (footballer, born 1890) (1890–?), footballer for Everton, Leeds City and Coventry City, also known as Jack Allan
John Allan (footballer, born 1931) (1931–2003), Scottish footballer for Dunfermline Athletic, Aberdeen, Third Lanark and Bradford PA
John Allan (footballer, fl. 1932–33), Scottish footballer for Hamilton Academical
John Allan (rugby union) (born 1963), Scottish and South African rugby union player
John Allan (golfer) (1847–1897), Scottish golfer
John Allan (cricketer) (1911–1987), Scottish cricketer
Johnny Allan (1888–1937), Australian rules footballer
John Allan (fighter) (born 1993), Brazilian mixed martial artist

Other 
John Allan (antiquarian) (1777–1863), Scottish born American antiquarian
John Allan (businessman) (born 1948), chairman of Tesco
John Allan (Canadian naval officer) (1928–2014), Canadian admiral
John Allan (colonel) (1746–1805), participant in the American Revolutionary War in the Massachusetts Militia
John Allan (minister) (1897–1979), New Zealand Presbyterian minister and professor of theology
John Allan (numismatist) (1884–1955), British numismatist
John Anthony Allan (born 1937), British geographer
John R. Allan, Scottish journalist, broadcaster, author, and farmer
Johnnie Allan (born 1938), American swamp pop musician

See also
Jonny Allan (born 1983), English footballer
James Allan (footballer, born 1866) (1866–1945), footballer for Queen's Park and Scotland (also known as John Allan)
John Allen (disambiguation)
Jack Allan (disambiguation)